Campomanesia guazumifolia is a species of tree in the family Myrtaceae.

The species ecological importance and has the possibility to be exploited by food and medical companies.

Names 
In Portuguese the species goes by the common name . The species is popularly called seven capotes, seven capes, capoteira, seven jackets, arázeiro, and araça.

Occurrence 
The species is native to Argentina, Brazil, Paraguay, and Uruguay. It is a characteristic species in Espírito Santo.

The species occurs in low attitude seasonal forests. It is also abundant in the Caatinga, Cerrado, and Atlantic Forest Biomes.

References 

guazumifolia